Zippo may refer to:
Zippo, a brand of refillable metal lighters
M67 Zippo, a flamethrowing variant of the American Patton tank
M132 Armored Flamethrower, nicknamed "Zippo"
Zippo 200 at the Glen, a NASCAR Nationwide Series race in New York state
Zippo, a character from Dinotopia (miniseries)

See also